Compsolechia amazonica is a moth of the family Gelechiidae. It was described by Edward Meyrick in 1918. It is found in Amazonas, Brazil.

References

Moths described in 1918
Compsolechia
Taxa named by Edward Meyrick